Bad Company is a computer game developed by Vectordean and originally published by Logotron in 1990. Released for the Amiga and Atari ST computer systems, the game was based on the concept of 1984 arcade game Space Harrier, with a grittier and more militaristic visual design. In 1991, the Amiga version was re-issued in the UK on Prism Leisure's "16-Bit Pocket Power" imprint.

References

External links
 Bad Company at Lemon Amiga
 Bad Company at Atari Mania

1990 video games
Amiga games
Atari ST games
Logotron games
Rail shooters
Single-player video games
Video games developed in the United Kingdom
Video games scored by David Whittaker
Vectordean games